Racot  is a village in the administrative district of Gmina Kościan, within Kościan County, Greater Poland Voivodeship, in west-central Poland.

The village has a population of 1,321.

There is a classicist palace in Racot.

References

External links
 Hiking Across Leszno-Region

Villages in Kościan County
Palaces in Poland